Atherinella elegans (the Fuerte silverside) is a species of Neotropical silversides (Atherinopsidae). It is found in Río del Fuerte, Sinaloa, Mexico.

References 

 Phylogenetic relationships and reclassification of menidiine silverside fishes with emphasis on the tribe Membradini. B Chernoff, Proceedings of the Academy of Natural Sciences of ..., 1986
 Systematics of American atherinid fishes of the genus Atherinella. I. The subgenus Atherinella. B Chernoff, Proceedings of the Academy of Natural Sciences of ..., 1986

External links 

elegans
Fish described in 1986
Freshwater fish of Mexico
Natural history of Sinaloa